Lin Sheng (born 5 January 1994) is a Chinese fencer.

Lin is from Fuzhou, Fujian. She won a gold medal in the girls' épée event at the 2010 Summer Youth Olympics. She was part of the Chinese girls' team which won gold in the team épée event at the 2011 Junior World Fencing Championships. At the 2015 International Fencing Federation Épée Grand Prix in Rio de Janeiro, she placed 40th. She won gold in the team épée event at the 2014 Asian Fencing Championships, along with teammates Qin Xue, Sun Yiwen, and Sun Yujie. She withdrew from the competition to represent China in fencing at the 2016 Summer Olympics due to health issues, but recovered later that year, and won gold in the women's individual épée event at the 2016 Chinese Fencing Championships.

References

External links

Profile at Sport195.com
Profile at Fencing Worldwide

1994 births
Living people
Sportspeople from Fuzhou
Chinese female fencers
Chinese épée fencers
Fencers at the 2010 Summer Youth Olympics
Fencers at the 2018 Asian Games
Asian Games gold medalists for China
Asian Games medalists in fencing
Medalists at the 2018 Asian Games
Fencers from Fujian
Youth Olympic gold medalists for China
Fencers at the 2020 Summer Olympics
Olympic fencers of China
21st-century Chinese women